Jacopo de' Boateri (active c. 1540) is an Italian painter, considered a follower of Francesco Francia. His works can be seen exhibited at the Galleria Borghese and the Louvre

References 

Year of birth unknown
Year of death unknown
16th-century Italian painters
Italian male painters
Painters from Bologna
Renaissance painters